eRikm is a French musician, composer and visual artist  who has been active in art since 1992. He is noted for his work with turntables.

He is most well known for his improvisational collaborations. Notable collaborators include: Luc Ferrari, Christian Marclay, Dieb13, Otomo Yoshihide, Mathilde Monnier, Les percussions de Strasbourg, and FM Einheit.

Since 1997, on his own or with collaborators, eRikm has toured (with 5-7 on-tour projects to date), and created by-request specific pieces.

Main works

Solo Album & composition 
 1999 : Zygosis - Sonoris
 1999 : Frame - Metamkine
 2001 : MonO FaCe MirRor - Sonoris
 2006 : Sixperiodes - Sirr records
 2007 : Variations Opportunistes - Label Ronda
 2008 : Steme - Room 40
 2010 : Lux Payllettes  - Entr'acte
 2011 : Visitation echoing  Presque Rien 2 de Luc Ferrari - Alga Marghen
 2012 : Austral - D'autres cordes records 
 2012 : Transfall - Room 40 
 2015 : Select archive I - L’Art de la fuite - Sonoris 	
 2016 : Doubse Hystérie - Monotype records 	
 2018 : Drum-Machines for Les Percussions de Strasbourg - PDS
 2018 : Flow - bandcamp
 2018 : Mistpouffers - Empreintes Digitales

Collaboration 
 2004 : Archives Sauvées des Eaux with Luc Ferrari - Angle Records
 2004 : Complementary contrasts with Christian Fennesz - Hat-Hut
 2005 : Trace cuts with Otomo Yoshihide  & Martin Tetreault - Musica gênera 
 2011 : Razine with Michel Doneda - Monotype records
 2013 : Pantoneon with Catherine Jauniaux - Mikroton Recordings

Re-organisation & re-composition 
 2003 : What a wonderful world with Jérôme Noetinger - Erstwhile Records
 2007 : ©haos ©lub with Dieb13 - Erstwhile Records
 2012 : Cartouche with Natacha Muslera - Monotype records
 2013 : Mal Des Ardents with Catherine Jauniaux - Mikroton Recordings 
 2014 : Ecotone with Martin Brandlmayr - Mikroton Recordings

Poire_Z  
 Andy Guhl, eRikm, Günter Müller, Norbert Möslang

 1999 : Poire Z - For4ears records
 2001 : Presque_Chic - Sonoris
 2002 : +, with Otomo Yoshihide • Sachiko M • Christian Marclay - Erstwhile Records
 2004 : Q, with Phil Minton - For4ears records

Post Poire_Z 
 2004 : Why Not Béchamel with Erikm + Günter Müller + Toshimaru Nakamura  - Mikroton Recordings
 2011 : Stodgy eRikm & Norbert Möslang - Mikroton Recordings
 2016 : Pavillon du Lac with  Günter Müller + Norbert Möslang + ErikM - Dolmen

References

External links 
Official website
Text edited in Frog magazine n°4, automne/hiver 2006 (French)
eRikm at discogs
Spiral Dregs, documentary by Alessandro Mercuri and Haijun Park (35min), interview by Jacqueline Caux, on ParisLike, 2012 (ISSN 2117-4725)

French composers
French male composers
1970 births
Living people
Artists from Mulhouse
Musicians from Mulhouse